The Fatah Central Committee is the highest decision-making body of the Palestinian organization and political party, Fatah.

History
The first Fatah Central Committee was formed in February 1963, consisting of ten members, including Yasser Arafat, Khalil al-Wazir, Salah Khalaf, and Khaled al-Hassan. Arafat and al-Wazir, who lobbied for increased personal responsibility, primarily faced opposition from al-Hassan who opposed premature military action against Israel which the former two advocated. 

The establishment of the Palestine Liberation Organization (PLO) in 1964 severely undermined Fatah, with 80% of its members joining the PLO's armed wing, the Palestinian Liberation Army. With this, Arafat and al-Wazir convinced the central committee to allow military operations. As a result, al-Assifa was formed as Fatah's armed wing, but Arafat's rival Abu Youssef was appointed its leader. In 1965, Arafat was chosen to replace him, but eventually began facing opposition from the central committee. Al-Hassan led the committee to cut funds to al-Assifa in an attempt to reduce its operations, but Arafat decided to relocate to Damascus, Syria where he received financial aid from Palestinians working abroad.

In the 1989 Fatah Conference, 18 Fatah members were elected to the committee, with Arafat as the secretary-general. Following Arafat's signing of the Oslo Accords in 1993, only half of the central committee became leading members in the newly established Palestinian National Authority. The rest of the committee either resigned or became inactive. Although now he had overwhelming support from the central committee, Arafat decided to restructure it to further strengthen his authority in the Palestinian territories. He convened a conference in Gaza in October 1995, in which he added to the committee "insiders" Zakaria al-Agha and Faisal Husseini. In November, the committee set up councils to organize campaigns for the Palestinian Legislative Council (PLC) elections and threatened to expel any Fatah member who ran as an independent.

Elections for the central committee were held on July 8, 2009, with 96 candidates competing for spots. Mahmoud Abbas was elected as chairman, and an additional three seats were added to the committee.

Current members
In December 2016, more than 1400 members of Fatah’s 7th Congress elected 18 members of the Central Committee and 80 for the Revolutionary Council. Six new members were added to the Central Committee while 12 were reelected. Outgoing members include Nabil Shaath, Nabil Abu Rudeineh, Zakaria al-Agha and Tayib Abdul Rahim. The current members of the Central Committee are:

 Marwan Barghouti
 Jibril Rajoub (Secretary General)
 Mohammad Ishtayeh aka Mohammad Shtayyeh
 Hussain Sheikh
 Mahmoud Aloul (Vice Chairman)
 Tawfiq Tirawi
 Saeb Erekat
 Ismail Jabr (new)
 Jamal Muheisen

 Nasser Kidwa
 Ahmad Hilles (new)
 Mohammad Madani
 Sabri Saidam (new)
 Samir Refaee (new)
 Azzam al-Ahmad
 Abbas Zaki
 Rawhi Fattouh (new)
 Dalal Salameh (new)

Mahmoud Abbas is the ex officio Chairman.

References

Bibliography
Atkins, Stephen. Encyclopedia of National Movements.
Rubin, Barry. Transformation of Palestinian Politics.

Central Committee of Fatah
Fatah